The 1926 Carnegie Tech Tartans football team represented the Carnegie Institute of Technology—now known as Carnegie Mellon University—in the 1926 college football season. The team defeated Notre Dame in a large upset.  The game was ranked the fourth-greatest upset in college football history by ESPN.

References

Carnegie Tech
Carnegie Mellon Tartans football seasons
Carnegie Tech Tartans football